Ada Marra (born Addolorata Marra, March 10, 1973, Paudex, Switzerland) is a Swiss political figure and a member of the Swiss Socialist Party.

Biography 
Ada Marra was born in Paudex of Italian parents from Apulia who migrated to Switzerland in the 1960s. She grew up in Paudex and attended a school in Lausanne, then studied at the University of Lausanne, where she obtained a bachelor's degree in political science in 1996. In the same year, she obtained Swiss citizenship while retaining the Italian nationality of her parents.
She joined the Swiss Socialist Party in 1997, where she was General Secretary for seven years.

In December 2004, she was elected a member of the Grand Council of the Canton of Vaud and three years later, in December 2007, she was elected National Councilor for the Canton of Vaud. She was a member of the Committee of the National Council for Political Institutions and she is member of the Committee for Economics and Taxation

In 2008, she introduced a parliamentary initiative asking for a facilitated naturalization for foreigners of the 3rd generation (foreigners born in Switzerland whose parents are born in Switzerland but their grandparents came to Switzerland as migrants) which led to the adoption by the Federal Assembly in 2016 of a decree amending the constitution and submitted to referendum on February 12, 2017. Ada Marra reached an unprecedented victory, thus  beating the right-wing oriented UDC with regards to the national identity (UDC's favorite ground).

Volunteering 
Marra is involved in several charity associations linked with the struggle against precariousness. She is a member of the Presidium of Caritas Switzerland in connection with the Roman Catholic Church and President of the Mother Sofia Foundation (which was originally linked to the Serbian Orthodox Church but no longer has religious affiliations Today) since June 1, 2011.

Publications 
Tu parles bien français pour une italienne. Illustration Denis Kormann. Georg. Geneva 2017

References

1973 births
University of Lausanne alumni
Social Democratic Party of Switzerland politicians
Living people
Canton of Vaud politicians
Swiss people of Italian descent